Megarex is the first album recorded by the Brazilian rock group Megarex. It was produced by the own band and released in 2004. This album includes the hits "Santo.com" and "El fuca vermejo no mi atropellará jamás", this last one recorded in portuñol.

Track listing

Personnel
Flavio Marchesin: vocals, bass, keyboards, banjo
Eduardo Tibira: electric guitar, acoustic guitar
Marco Camarano: electric guitar, acoustic guitar
Luiz Galdino: violin
André Novais: drums

Special guests
Albino Infantozzih: drums (in "Misturada", "Santo.com", "The repente", "O texugo Venâncio", "Negro")
Anthony D'amasco: drums (in "Bar do Zé Loco", "El fuca vermejo no mi atropellará jamás", "Pelo ladrão", "João, o pescador", "Homem stress (versão 2)")
Rodrigo Thurler: drums (in "Homem stress")
Frederico Panzio: percussion (in "Santo.com")
Cristina Alemann: vocals (in "Santo.com")
Ângelo Vizarro Jr.: rap (in "Misturada")

References

2004 albums
Megarex albums